János Mihálkovics (3 June 1889 – 6 February 1956) was a sailor from Hungary who represented his country at the 1928 Summer Olympics in Amsterdam, Netherlands.

Sources 

Sailors at the 1928 Summer Olympics – 6 Metre
Olympic sailors of Hungary
Hungarian male sailors (sport)
1889 births
1956 deaths